Fang  is a Central African language spoken by around 1 million people, most of them in Equatorial Guinea, and northern Gabon, where it is the dominant Bantu language; Fang is also spoken in southern Cameroon, the Republic of the Congo, and small fractions of the islands of São Tomé and Príncipe. It is related to the Bulu and Ewondo languages of southern Cameroon.

Under President Macías Nguema, Fang was the official language of Equatorial Guinea, although in 1982, the third Constitution once again replaced it with Spanish. Since then, each version of the Constitution has recognized Fang and other languages indigenous to the country as integral to the national culture, despite these languages not having official status.

There are many different variants of Fang in northern Gabon and southern Cameroon. Maho (2009) lists Southwest Fang as a distinct language. The other dialects are Ntoumou, Okak, Mekê, Atsi (Batsi), Nzaman (Zaman), Mveni, and Mvaïe.

Distribution
According to ALCAM (2012), Fang is mainly spoken in northern Gabon and also in Equatorial Guinea. Dialects include Ntumu, Mvayn, and Okak. In Cameroon, Fang is spoken in the southern half of Dja-et-Lobo department (Southern Region) south of Djoum. It is also spoken in the southeast of Mvila department: south of Mvangan, plus small isolated parts of Océan department between Lolodorf and Kribi where the Okak dialect is spoken. The other dialects, Mvayn and Ntumu, are spoken in Vallée-du-Ntem department.

Corpus and lexicology

Despite Fang's lack of any well-defined literary corpus, it is of note that linguists have, in the past, made attempts to compile dictionaries and lexicons for the Fang language. The two most notable ones to be proposed or fully compiled were made by Maillard (2007) and Bibang (2014). Neither created a direct Fang-English dictionary, but opted instead to separate the two languages via a third European language as a bridge for various loanwords.

The translation efforts to English have been done through Romance languages: specifically, Spanish and French. The latter of the two languages would likely have had the most impact on the language, given the occupation of Gabon by the French during the existence of French Equatorial Africa (itself part of French West Africa), which lasted 75 years from 1885 to 1960. To a lesser extent, in São Tomé and Príncipe, Portuguese also likely has influenced the dialects of Fang present there, due to the country being occupied by Portugal for most of the islands' history of habitation.

Phonology

Vowels

Fang has 7 vowels, each of which can have short or long realizations.

Diphthongs

Tone

Fang distinguishes between at least 5 lexical tones, conventionally called: high, mid, low, rising and falling. One vowel in a sequences of vowels can be elided in casual speech, though its tone remains and attaches to the remaining vowel.

Consonants
In Fang, there are 24 plain consonants. The majority of them can become prenasalized:

 is only used in interjections and loanwords.

It is also important to note that in Fang, at every "hiatus" (shock of two vowels), such as in "Ma adzi", it is required for one to make the second word an aphetism, dropping the pronunciation of the  sound at the start of the second word (e.g. "Ma dzi").

See also

Beti-Pahuin

References

External links
 Bantulanyi
 http://scholar.sun.ac.za/handle/10019.1/1229
 https://web.archive.org/web/20080630064631/http://monefang.com/parlons1.html Monefang, archived from the original (2008). Note: This site is mostly in French.

 
Beti languages
Languages of Equatorial Guinea
Languages of Cameroon
Languages of the Republic of the Congo
Languages of Gabon
Languages of São Tomé and Príncipe